Sherwood Elementary School (Prince Edward Island) - Charlottetown, Prince Edward Island
 Sherwood Elementary School (Arkansas) - Sherwood, Arkansas
 Sherwood Elementary School (Ohio) - Hamilton County, Ohio
 Sherwood Elementary School (North Carolina) - Gaston, North Carolina
 Sherwood Elementary School (California) - Salinas, California